The following events happened during 1951 in the Kingdom of Belgium.

Incumbents
Monarch –
Leopold III (until 16 July), with Prince Baudouin as regent
Baudouin (from 17 July)
Prime Minister – Joseph Pholien

Events

 9 to 10 January – Eisenhower in Belgium.
 31 January – Belgian contingent of the United Nations Command for the Korean War disembark at Busan.
 18 April – Treaty of Paris signed, establishing the European Coal and Steel Community with Belgium as a member.
 25 April – Pope Pius XII makes the Church of Our Lady of Tongre in Chièvres a minor basilica.
 16 July – Royal Question culminates with the formal abdication of King Leopold III
 17 July – Baudouin of Belgium sworn in as king.
 14 October – Relics of Saint Albert of Leuven installed in Basilica of the Sacred Heart, Brussels
 5 December – Migration Conference in Brussels adopts the resolution establishing Provisional Intergovernmental Committee for the Movement of Migrants from Europe.

Art and architecture

Sculpture
 Mari Andriessen, Bomb Victim (Middelheim Open Air Sculpture Museum)
 Alfred Courtens, Equestrian Statue of Albert I, Brussels

Births
 10 June – Lucien De Brauwere, cyclist (died 2020)

Deaths
 20 December – Valerius Coucke (born 1888), biblical scholar

References

 
1950s in Belgium
Belgium
Belgium
Years of the 20th century in Belgium